Vehbi Dinçerler Science High School (abbreviated as VDFL) is a high school in Gaziantep, Turkey. It was founded in 1985 by Abdulkadir Aksu, former governor of the City, interior minister of Turkey.

External links 
   Gaziantep Fen Lisesi

   Gaziantep Fen Lisesiler Derneği

High schools in Turkey
Buildings and structures in Gaziantep
Educational institutions established in 1985
1985 establishments in Turkey